Comilla-7 is a constituency represented in the Jatiya Sangsad (National Parliament) of Bangladesh since 2008 by Ali Ashraf of the Awami League.

Boundaries 
The constituency encompasses Chandina Upazila.

History 
The constituency was created for the first general elections in newly independent Bangladesh, held in 1973.

Ahead of the 2008 general election, the Election Commission redrew constituency boundaries to reflect population changes revealed by the 2001 Bangladesh census. The 2008 redistricting altered the boundaries of the constituency.

Ahead of the 2014 general election, the Election Commission reduced the boundaries of the constituency. Previously it had also included one union parishad of Barura Upazila:Chitadda.

Members of Parliament

Elections

Elections in the 2010s 
Ali Ashraf was re-elected unopposed in the 2014 general election after opposition parties withdrew their candidacies in a boycott of the election.

Elections in the 2000s 

AKM Abu Taher died in September 2004. Zakaria Taher Sumon, his son, was elected in a December by-election.

Elections in the 1990s

References

External links
 

Parliamentary constituencies in Bangladesh
Cumilla District